William Thomas Sadler (born April 13, 1950) is an American stage, film, and television actor. His television and motion picture roles have included Chesty Puller in The Pacific, Luther Sloan in Star Trek: Deep Space Nine, Sheriff Jim Valenti in Roswell, convict Heywood in The Shawshank Redemption, Senator Vernon Trent in Hard to Kill, Death in Bill & Ted's Bogus Journey and Bill & Ted Face the Music, and Colonel Stuart in Die Hard 2. He played Matthew Ellis in Iron Man 3, Marvel's Agents of S.H.I.E.L.D., and WHIH Newsfront. He also recurs as John McGarrett in the 2010 remake of the 1968 television series Hawaii Five-O, and the Boston boxing promoter and suspected drug dealer Gino Fish in the Jesse Stone television film series, opposite Tom Selleck. He also played Don in the 1992 movie Trespass starring Ice Cube, Ice-T and Bill Paxton.

Early life
Sadler was born in Buffalo, New York, the son of Jane and William Sadler. From an early age, he took to performing in front of an audience. Playing a variety of stringed instruments, he found hometown success during his high-school years at Orchard Park High School. He took on the persona of Banjo Bill Sadler, a banjo-playing singer who cracked jokes while playing.

After graduating from high school, he enrolled in SUNY Geneseo; then spent two years at Cornell University, where he earned his master's degree in acting with a minor in speech communications. He is a certified speech teacher and practiced in accents.

Career

Sadler took his first post-school role in Florida and soon relocated to Boston, moving in with his sister while scrubbing the floors of a lobster boat by day and performing his acting roles at night. 

A chance meeting with an old schoolmate on a trip into the city resulted in Sadler's casting in an off-off-Broadway production of Chekhov's Ivanov.

After a brief turn at the Trinity Square Repertory Company in Providence, Rhode Island, Sadler moved back to New York and rented an apartment in the East Village, beginning twelve years in which he appeared in over 75 productions, including originating the role of Sgt. Toomey in the Broadway run of Neil Simon's Biloxi Blues, opposite Matthew Broderick in 1985.

Sadler is best known for his roles in the 1990 action film Die Hard 2 as Colonel Stuart, as Heywood in the 1994 prison drama The Shawshank Redemption, Death in the 1991 comedy Bill & Ted's Bogus Journey, and as Brayker in Demon Knight. 
When he first auditioned for a role in Die Hard 2, he was told he was too young. With a make-up artist friend's help, Sadler re-auditioned as a 70-year-old, and won the part. In addition to appearing in Bill & Ted's Bogus Journey as Death, Sadler also appears as himself, with his real-life wife and 5-year-old daughter, in scenes where families around the world respond to Bill and Ted's actions. He reprised his Death role in the 2020 sequel Bill & Ted Face the Music.

Sadler was also a regular on the television series Roswell as Sheriff Jim Valenti, and in Wonderfalls as Darrin Tyler.

His other film credits include Trespass, K-9, Project X, Disturbing Behavior, Kinsey, The Battle of Shaker Heights, Purple Heart, Jimmy and Judy and August Rush.

Sadler's TV guest appearances include In the Heat of the Night, Roseanne, Tru Calling, Tour of Duty, CSI, Numb3rs, and Law & Order: Criminal Intent. He had a recurring role on Star Trek: Deep Space Nine as Luther Sloan.

He appeared in three episodes as Sloan in Star Trek: Deep Space Nine'''s final two seasons. In 2007, he played Carlton Fog on ABC's Traveler, and in 2008 he appeared in both NBC's Medium as well as Fox Television's Fringe. The 1989 pilot episode of the HBO horror anthology series Tales from the Crypt featured Sadler in its lead role. In March 2011, Sadler made a guest appearance in NBC's Chase.

Sadler portrayed Julius Caesar in the contemporary adaptation of William Shakespeare's Julius Caesar on Broadway alongside Denzel Washington at the Belasco Theatre. Recently, he finished shooting with American independent filmmakers Dylan Bank and Morgan Pehme on the film Nothing Sacred. Sadler portrayed the robot Victor in the 2010 video game, Fallout: New Vegas. Sadler played Lee Underwood in Greetings from Tim Buckley, a film on Tim and Jeff Buckley, which premiered at the 2012 Toronto International Film Festival.

Sadler appeared as Matthew Ellis, the President of the United States, in Iron Man 3 (2013). 

In 2015, Sadler was part of the Texas Frightmare Weekend, and starred in Ava's Possessions, which was screened at SXSW.

On September 8, 2021, it was announced that Sadler was cast in the Stephen King adaptation of Salem's Lot'' in an undisclosed role.

Filmography

Film

Television

Web

Video games

References

External links
 
 

1950 births
Living people
20th-century American male actors
21st-century American male actors
American male film actors
American male television actors
American male voice actors
American people of English descent
American people of German descent
American people of Scottish descent
Male actors from Buffalo, New York
Cornell University alumni
State University of New York at Geneseo alumni